Kashmiris are an Indo-Aryan ethnolinguistic group speaking the Kashmiri language, living mostly, but not exclusively, in the Kashmir Valley of Jammu and Kashmir, India.

History 

The earliest known Neolithic sites in Kashmir valley are from c. 3000 BCE. The most important sites are at Burzahom. During the later Vedic period, the Uttara–Kurus settled in Kashmir. In 326 BCE, Abisares, the king of Kashmir, aided Porus against Alexander the Great in the Battle of Hydaspes. After the battle, Abhisares submitted to Alexander by sending him treasures and elephants. 

During the reign of Ashoka (304–232 BCE), Kashmir became part of the Maurya Empire and the city of Srinagari (Srinagar) was built. Kanishka (127–151 CE), an emperor of the Kushan dynasty, conquered Kashmir. In the eighth century, during the Karkota Empire, Kashmir grew as an imperial power. Lalitaditya Muktapida defeated Yashovarman of Kanyakubja and conquered the eastern kingdoms of Magadha, Kamarupa, Gauda, and Kalinga. He defeated the Arabs at Sindh. The Utpala dynasty, founded by Avantivarman, followed the Karkotas. Queen Didda, who descended from the Hindu Shahis of Udabhandapura on her mother's side, took over as ruler in the second half of the 10th century. After her death in 1003 CE the Lohara dynasty ruled the region. 

In 1339 Shah Mir became the ruler of Kashmir, establishing the Shah Mir dynasty. During the rule of the Shah Mir dynasty Islam spread in Kashmir. From 1586 to 1751 the Mughal Empire ruled Kashmir. The Afghan Durrani Empire ruled from 1747 until 1819. The Sikhs, under Ranjit Singh, annexed Kashmir in 1819. In 1846, after the First Anglo-Sikh War, the Treaty of Lahore was signed and upon the purchase of the region from the British under the Treaty of Amritsar, the Raja of Jammu, Gulab Singh, became ruler of Kashmir. The rule of the Dogra dynasty under the British Crown lasted until 1947, when the princely state of Jammu and Kashmir became part of India. It is now a disputed territory, administered by three countries: India, Pakistan, and the People's Republic of China.

Geographic distribution

There are about 6.8 million speakers of Kashmiri and related dialects in Jammu and Kashmir and amongst the Kashmiri diaspora in other states of India. Most Kashmiris are located in the Kashmir Valley and other areas of Jammu and Kashmir. In the Kashmir valley, they form a majority.

Kashmiri is spoken by roughly five percent of Azad Kashmir's population. According to the 1998 Pakistan Census, there were 132,450 Kashmiri speakers in Azad Kashmir. Native speakers of the language were dispersed in "pockets" throughout Azad Kashmir, particularly in the districts of Muzaffarabad (15%), Neelam (20%) and Hattian (15%), with very small minorities in Haveli (5%) and Bagh (2%). The Kashmiri spoken in Muzaffarabad is distinct from, although still intelligible with, the Kashmiri of the Neelam Valley to the north. In Neelam Valley, Kashmiri is the second most widely spoken language and the majority language in at least a dozen or so villages, where in about half of these, it is the sole mother tongue.  The Kashmiri dialect of Neelum is closer to the variety spoken in northern Kashmir Valley, particularly Kupwara. At the 2017 Census of Pakistan, as many as 350,000 people declared their first language to be Kashmiri.

A process of language shift is observable among Kashmiri-speakers in Azad Kashmir according to linguist Tariq Rahman, as they gradually adopt local dialects such as Pahari-Pothwari, Hindko or move towards the lingua franca Urdu. This has resulted in these languages gaining ground at the expense of Kashmiri. There have been calls for the promotion of Kashmiri at an official level; in 1983, a Kashmiri Language Committee was set up by the government to patronise Kashmiri and impart it in school-level education. However, the limited attempts at introducing the language have not been successful, and it is Urdu, rather than Kashmiri, that Kashmiri Muslims have seen as their identity symbol. Rahman notes that efforts to organise a Kashmiri language movement have been challenged by the scattered nature of the Kashmiri-speaking community in Azad Kashmir.

Language 
The Kashmiri language is one of the 22 scheduled languages of India. It was a part of the eighth Schedule in the former constitution of the Jammu and Kashmir. Along with other regional languages mentioned in the Sixth Schedule, as well as Hindi and Urdu, the Kashmiri language was to be developed in the state.

Persian began to be used as the court language in Kashmir during the 14th centuries, under the influence of Islam. It was replaced by Urdu in 1889 during the Dogra rule. In 2020, Kashmiri became an official language in the Union Territory of Jammu and Kashmir for the first time.

Kashmiri is closely related to Poguli and Kishtwari, which are spoken in the mountains to the south of the Kashmir Valley and have sometimes been counted as dialects of Kashmiri.

Krams (surnames) 

Kashmiri Hindus claim to be Saraswat Brahmins and are known by the exonym Pandit. The Muslims living in Kashmir are of the same stock as the Kashmiri Pandit community and are designated as Kashmiri Muslims. Kashmiri Muslims are descended from Kashmiri Hindus and are also known as 'Sheikhs'. Both the Kashmiri Hindus and Muslim society reckons descent patrilineally. Certain property and titles may be inherited through the male line, but certain inheritances may accrue through the female line. After Kashmiri Hindus had converted to Islam they largely retained their family names (kram) which indicated their original profession, locality or community. These include:

 Bhat, Bhatt or Butt
 Dhar, Dar
 Lone
 Kaul
 Raina
 Kak
 Kachru
 Mantu/Mantoo/Mintoo
 Ganai
 Tantray
 Mattoo
 Pandit
 Rajguru
 Bhan
 Rather
 Razdan
 Munshi
 Sapru
 Magre/Magray
 Yatoo
 Madan
 Wani

Culture

Music 

Some traditional types of music of Kashmir are Chakri, Henzae, and Ladishah. 
 
A traditional dance form usually performed by women on occasions like marriages and similar social functions is Rouf.

Cuisine 

Rice is the staple food of Kashmir. Meat and rice are the popular food item in Kashmir.

Noon Chai or Sheer Chai and Kahwah or Kehew are beverages of Kashmir. 
 
Kashmir is also known for its bakery tradition. Sheermal, baqerkhayn (puff pastry), lavas (unleavened bread) and kulcha are popular baked goods.

See also 

 List of Kashmiris
 Kashmiri diaspora
 Kashmiri Hindus
 Kashmiri Shaikh
 Kashmiriyat
 1931 Kashmir agitation
 1941 Census of Jammu and Kashmir
 Kashmir conflict
 All Parties Hurriyat Conference
 Elections in Jammu and Kashmir
 Theory of Kashmiri descent from lost tribes of Israel

Notes

References

Bibliography

Encyclopedia 
 
 Khan, Nyla Ali. Kashmir. The Oxford Encyclopedia of Islam and Women.

Scholarly books 
 Ames, Frank (1986). The Kashmir shawl and its Indo-French influence. Antique Collectors' Club. .
 
 
 
 C. Baron V. Hugel, Annotated By D.C. Sharma (1984). Kashmir Under Maharaja Ranjit Singh. Atlantic Publishers & Distributors Pvt Ltd. .
 
 
 Drace-Francis, Alex, European Identity: A Historical Readered. European Identity: a historical reader.] Palgrave Macmillan, 2013.
 
 
 
 
 
 
 
 
 Watt, George (2014). A Dictionary of the Economic Products of India, Part 2. Cambridge University Press. .

Books 
 
 
 
 
 
 Dar, P Krishna (2000). Kashmiri Cooking. Penguin UK. .
 
 
 
 
 
 Madison Books; Andrews McMeel Publishing, LLC; Corby Kummer (1 November 2007). 1001 Foods To Die For. Andrews McMeel Publishing. .
 
 
 
 
 
 
 
 
 
 
 
 
 Solomon H. Katz; William Woys Weaver (2003). Encyclopedia of Food and Culture: Food production to Nuts. Scribner. .
 The Panjab Past and Present. Department of Punjab Historical Studies, Punjabi University. 1993. p. 22.

Journal articles 
 Bhasin, M.K.; Nag, Shampa (2002). "A Demographic Profile of the People of Jammu and Kashmir"(PDF). Journal of Human Ecology
 
 Journal of History. Department of History, Jadavpur University. 1981. p. 76.
 The Journal of the Anthropological Survey of India, Volume 52. The Survey.
 The quarterly journal of the Mythic society (Bangalore)., Volume 96. The Society.

Primary sources 
 
 Mohamed, C K. Census of India, 1921. Vol. XXII: Kashmir. Part I: Report.
 Proceedings – Indian History Congress, Volume 63. Indian History Congress. 2003.
 Punjab Census Report 17 Feb 1881. 1883.
 Ram, Anant; Raina, Hira Nand (1933). Census of India, 1931. Vol. XXIV: Jammu and Kashmir State. Part II: Imperial and State Tables.
 Sir George Watt (1903). Indian Art at Delhi 1903: Being the Official Catalogue of the Delhi Exhibition 1902–1903. Motilal Banarsidass Publ. .

External links 

Linguistic groups of the constitutionally recognised official languages of India
Ethnic groups in India

Ethnic groups divided by international borders
Ethnic groups in South Asia
Indo-Aryan peoples